Jeff Webb is an American entrepreneur and business executive primarily focused on the development of cheerleading. He is the founder of the Universal Cheerleading Association (UCA) and Varsity Spirit (along with its parent, Varsity Brands). He is the founder and current president of the International Cheer Union, the world governing body of the sport of cheerleading, as well as founder and chairman of The New American Populist.

Education

Webb attended the University of Oklahoma where he was a yell leader for the school's cheer squad. During college, Webb worked for the National Cheerleaders Association which was founded by Lawrence Herkimer. He planned to go to law school but instead accepted an offer to work at the NCA, which launched his business career.

Career

In 1971, Webb began working full-time for Lawrence Herkimer's National Cheerleaders Association (NCA). He went on to found the Universal Cheerleading Association (UCA) and Varsity Spirit in 1974 and would later purchase the NCA after Herkimer retired. Like the NCA, the UCA began as a series of training camps and clinics for high school and college cheerleaders that eventually added cheerleading competitions. Varsity Fashions is a cheer apparel and accessory brand.

In 2012, Varsity merged with Herff Jones, an Indianapolis company that produces items like graduation apparel and class rings. Webb would serve as president and CEO of the company effective July 1, 2013. Webb's company had already become known as Varsity Brands. Along with Herff Jones, the company also oversees BSN Sports (which it acquired in 2013), Varsity Spirit, the UCA, and the NCA.

In 2014, Webb became the Chairman of Herff Jones. In 2016, he stepped down as CEO of Varsity Brands. Bain Capital Private Equity bought Varsity Brands for $2.8 billion in 2018. Varsity Brands' annual revenues exceed $1.8 billion, according to the company. It has more than 8,000 full-time employees. As of 2019, Webb is Varsity Spirit's chairman, and continues to teach and lead cheer camps.

Webb is often credited with modernizing cheerleading by making it more competitive, bringing it to the mainstream audience with partnerships with ESPN, favoring more acrobatics and athleticism, and creating new outfit designs (among other things). He is the founder and current president of the International Cheer Union, the world governing body of the sport of cheerleading. He is also recognized as one of the leaders in the sport who has pushed for international recognition, including adding it as an Olympic sport.

References

External links
Varsity website

American cheerleaders
American businesspeople
University of Oklahoma alumni
Year of birth missing (living people)
Living people